Christian High School is a private Christian high school in O'Fallon, Missouri, with many students in grades pre-K through 12. The school mascot is the Eagle and the school colors are teal, black, and white.

History
The school started as an outgrowth of Living Word Christian School, an elementary school in Saint Peters, Missouri in St. Charles County.  In 1999, Tom Hughes donated  of real estate to Living Word.  With the help of donations, work was soon completed on the  building. As of the 2013–14 school year, they joined forces with Westgate Christian Academy to create one school.

Sports

Snce 2008–2009, the school has been a member of the Missouri State High School Activities Association. This allows the athletic teams to compete on a higher level against larger private and smaller public schools.

The soccer team has won district competitions four years in a row.

The school's cheerleaders compete at a national level and in 2010 received 7th place in their division nationally.

Christian High's dance team started in 2003, and now competes at a local level through MSHSAA.

The school has both girls and boys soccer, volleyball, basketball, and track/cross country, and boys teams for football and baseball. Cheerleading, dance, and softball teams are available for girls. The golf team is co-ed but it is male dominated.

References

External links
Official site of entire Living Word Christian School system

Christian schools in Missouri
High schools in St. Charles County, Missouri
Private schools in St. Charles County, Missouri
Private high schools in Missouri